The Last Place to Go is a live album by Boxhead Ensemble, released on October 20, 1998 through Atavistic Records.

Track listing

Personnel 
Musicians
Edith Frost – vocals (9)
Ryan Hembrey – bass guitar (4-8)
Charles Kim – bowed guitar, steel guitar and violin (1-3, 10, 11)
Michael Krassner – musical direction, guitar, keyboards and melodica (2-5, 7-10), mixing, recording
Fred Lonberg-Holm – cello (1-3, 10, 11)
Will Oldham – guitar and melodica (1, 2, 11)
Julie Pomerleau – violin (4-6, 8)
Carolyn Reed – vocals (7)
Scott Tuma – guitar (2-5, 7-9)
Mick Turner – guitar and melodica (1, 2, 11)
Jim White – drums and percussion (2-11)
Production and additional personnel
Jan Hiddink – production (1, 2)
Berry Kamer – production (1, 2)
Braden King – mixing, recording

References

External links 
 

1998 live albums
Atavistic Records albums
Boxhead Ensemble albums